Inselsee is a lake in the Rostock district in Mecklenburg-Vorpommern, Germany. At an elevation of 11.4 m, its surface area is 4.58 km². The lake is divided into two parts by a small 60 ha island „Schöninsel“. While the northern part of the lake is relatively flat, the average depth of the southern part is up to 6 m. The island (Schöninsel) is connected to the mainland by a bridge.

The lake is located in the town limits of Güstrow, south of the city center.

On the southern shore of Inselsee, the studio of Ernst Barlach, a German sculptor, is located. It was used by Barlach in the 1930s and currently functions as a museum.

References

External links 
 

Lakes of Mecklenburg-Western Pomerania